Globoidnan A is a lignan found in Eucalyptus globoidea, a tree native to Australia.

The molecule has been found to weakly inhibit the action of HIV integrase (IC50 = 0.64 μM) in vitro. HIV integrase is an enzyme which is responsible for the introduction of HIV viral DNA into a host's cellular DNA.  It is not known that globoidnan A inhibits the action of other retroviral integrases.

References 

Lignans
Naphthalenes
Catechols
Carboxylate esters